The 11th season of the television series Arthur was originally broadcast on PBS in the United States from June 25 to September 7, 2007 and contains 10 episodes. This is the last season in which Cameron Ansell voices Arthur. Starting in season sixteen, he returns to voice the new character Rafi. Robert Naylor replaced Jason Szwimmer as the voice of D.W. This is also the last season in which Paul-Stuart Brown voices Brain. This is the last season animated by AKOM.

Episodes

References

General references 
 
 
 
 

2007 American television seasons
Arthur (TV series) seasons
2007 Canadian television seasons